John Garstang (12 November 1876 – 1957) was an English footballer who played in the Football League for Blackburn Rovers.

References

1876 births
1957 deaths
English footballers
Association football forwards
English Football League players
Blackburn Rovers F.C. players
Chorley F.C. players